Sylvia Johanna Martha Barlag (born 4 May 1954) is a retired track and field athlete and physicist from the Netherlands. She competed in pentathlon at the 1980 Summer Olympics and finished in 10th place. Between 1979 and 1981 she was the national champion in high jump.

Biography
Barlag holds a PhD in physics from the University of Amsterdam (1984). Between 1983 and 1989 she worked as a researcher at CERN, more specific in the Obelix experiment for LEAR, as part of the collaborative charm hadroproduction experiment for Super Proton Synchrotron (SPS) as well as in DELPHI for LEP. After Cern in 1989 and until 2006 she worked at the Royal Netherlands Meteorological Institute. 
Barlag got married in 1987 and has two children. She works as a quality control manager in an international high-tech firm and is a member of national (2002–present), European (2007–present) and international (2011–present) athletics federations.

Olympic Results

Results

Women's Pentathlon

References

1954 births
Living people
Dutch female high jumpers
Dutch pentathletes
Athletes (track and field) at the 1980 Summer Olympics
Olympic athletes of the Netherlands
Universiade medalists in athletics (track and field)
People associated with CERN
Athletes from Amsterdam
University of Amsterdam alumni
Universiade silver medalists for the Netherlands
Medalists at the 1979 Summer Universiade